Jire Khursani (Translation: Hot Chillies) was a popular Nepali sitcom that aired every Wednesday at 9pm NPT on Nepal Television. It was one of the most viewed television programs in Nepal. It was produced by Media Hub Pvt. Ltd. Exclusive copyrights of Jire Khursani for international and web broadcasting are held by Ram Saraswoti (RamSar) Media Pvt. Ltd.

Beginning
The series started in 2003 and ended in 2015 after 12 years of continuous broadcast. It has already restarted again. It was produced and directed by Jeetu Nepal and Shivahari Paudel who were the main actors in the show as well.

Characters 
 Shivahari Paudel as Asina Prasad
 Jeetu Nepal as Mundre
 Kiran K.C. as Mama
 Rajaram Paudel as Thulo Bau
 Sabita Gurung as Thuli
 Anju Shrestha as Hatti
 Manoj Acharya as Khurapati Hakim
 Hima Koirala as Khurapati Hakimni
 Gopal Nepal Fiste as "niyam kada cha" traffic
 Debiram Parajuli as Bhoke
 Dolma Lama as Dolma
 Shivahari Bairagi as Neta Ji
 Niraj Nepal as Mukunde 
 Prem Pandey 
 Shishir Amgai
 Shivahari Acharya
 Mukunda Acharya
 Nirmal Paudel
 Sudarshan Shibakoti
 Saramsh Thapaliya

Plot
Jire Khursani portrays social problems suffered by everyday people with a comic punch. The show also features issues of polygamy; two wives of Shivahari Paudel live under the same roof with their children.

Jeetu Nepal plays Mundre (Mr. Ear-ring wearer) who says it with much pride that he is the first one in his entire family to have passed SLC. He wears a wool cap all year round and a lot of jewellery. The role of his father Asina Prasad (Mr. Hailstones) is played by Shivahari Paudel, who has a habit of saying "Mukhama Hannu Jasto" all the time. He has two wives out of which the latter one is the mother of Mundre. The other one is Chothale, whose son is Bhoke. Bhoke is a consummate eater and hungry all the time. He eats all the time and when not fed breaks into a fit of sobs.

Mama (maternal uncle) is played by Kiran K.C. who has a habit of saying "Eh Rata Makai" and was married to a rich Sherpa girl who merely uses him as an object of desire. Frustrated, the show takes crazy twists and revolves around a restless and noisy family. Rajaram Poudel has also special role as Thulo Bau (paternal uncle) of Mundre.

Asina Prasad is the main character. He makes the show interesting with his crooked attitude. He has many messes with law and other people and this show revolves in a plot of comedy by crookery.

References

External links
 Media Hub Nepal

Nepalese television sitcoms
2010s Nepalese television series